Archibald Macdonald Gorman (10 April 1909 – 18 September 1992) was a Scottish footballer who played as a wing half.

Born in Lochore, he was a modern-day holding midfielder. Gorman began his career with Edinburgh City before being signed by fellow Scotsman Bob Jack for Plymouth Argyle in 1931. 

Regarded as a tenacious tackler, his energy and determination was a big feature of the Pilgrims team in the 1930s, along with the attacking prowess of Jack Leslie and Sammy Black. His Football League career with the club was ended by the Second World War, but Gorman returned to assist the team rebuild after the war as player coach.

Gorman died in Tavistock, Devon, in 1992 at the age of 83.

References

1909 births
1992 deaths
Footballers from Edinburgh
Scottish footballers
Association football wing halves
Edinburgh City F.C. (1928) players
Plymouth Argyle F.C. players
English Football League players